The barred wedge-snout ctenotus (Ctenotus schomburgkii)  is a species of skink found in Australia.

References

schomburgkii
Reptiles described in 1863
Taxa named by Wilhelm Peters